Christopher Scheer (born September 8, 1968) is an American writer, and the co-author, with Robert Scheer and Lakshmi Chaudhry, of The Five Biggest Lies Bush Told Us About Iraq, published in 2003 in the U.S., the United Kingdom and Australia. The book appeared on the Los Angeles Times bestseller list and was a part of the national debate in 2004 about the then still popular Iraq War. In 2010, he received co-author credit, with his father, on The Great American Stickup, which also appeared on the Los Angeles Times bestseller list. In 2016, he received co-author credit for "California Comeback: How a 'Failed State' Became a Model for the Nation," with Narda Zacchino.

Biography
Scheer was born in Berkeley, California.  His parents are Anne Butterfield Weills and journalist Robert Scheer.

A graduate of Berkeley High School (1985) and UC Santa Barbara (1990), he co-founded and edited Prognosis, an English-language newspaper in Prague. Later, he worked with Oliver Stone as a creative consultant on the Academy-award nominated script for Nixon, as well as several unproduced scripts. 

After working as an editor at The San Francisco Examiner for several years, as well as writing for The Nation, the Los Angeles Times and other publications, he launched the news/activism website Workingforchange.com for Working Assets, then moved on to become the managing editor of the alternative news site, Alternet. Currently, he teaches debate, mock trial, and journalism at Skyline High School in Oakland, California.  He is the advisor for Skyline's national award winning student newspaper The Oracle.

References

1968 births
Living people
American people of German descent
American people of Russian-Jewish descent
American non-fiction writers
University of California, Santa Barbara alumni